Agia, ayia, aghia, hagia, haghia or AGIA may refer to:

Agia, feminine form of Agios, 'saint'

Geography
Agia, Cyprus
Agia, Chania, a town in Chania (regional unit), Crete, Greece
Agia, Larissa, Greece
Agia (Meteora), a rock in Thessaly, Greece
Agia, Parga, a town in Parga, Epirus

Other uses
Saint Agia (died c. 711), Belgian Catholic saint also known as Aye
Alaska Gasline Inducement Act, Alaskan State law
Agia (moth), a synonym of the moth genus Acasis

See also